The Cheryomushki Constituency (No.209) is a Russian legislative constituency in Moscow. It is based in South-Western Moscow along the Leninsky Avenue.

Members elected

Election results

1993

|-
! colspan=2 style="background-color:#E9E9E9;text-align:left;vertical-align:top;" |Candidate
! style="background-color:#E9E9E9;text-align:left;vertical-align:top;" |Party
! style="background-color:#E9E9E9;text-align:right;" |Votes
! style="background-color:#E9E9E9;text-align:right;" |%
|-
|style="background-color:"|
|align=left|Pavel Medvedev
|align=left|Independent
|50,824
|22.61%
|-
|style="background-color:"|
|align=left|Aleksandr Ishchenko
|align=left|Independent
| -
|16.38%
|-
| colspan="5" style="background-color:#E9E9E9;"|
|- style="font-weight:bold"
| colspan="3" style="text-align:left;" | Total
| 224,755
| 100%
|-
| colspan="5" style="background-color:#E9E9E9;"|
|- style="font-weight:bold"
| colspan="4" |Source:
|
|}

1995

|-
! colspan=2 style="background-color:#E9E9E9;text-align:left;vertical-align:top;" |Candidate
! style="background-color:#E9E9E9;text-align:left;vertical-align:top;" |Party
! style="background-color:#E9E9E9;text-align:right;" |Votes
! style="background-color:#E9E9E9;text-align:right;" |%
|-
|style="background-color:#00A44E"|
|align=left|Pavel Medvedev (incumbent)
|align=left|Bloc '89
|74,587
|24.65%
|-
|style="background-color:"|
|align=left|Yuly Gusman
|align=left|Independent
|48,291
|15.96%
|-
|style="background-color:"|
|align=left|Mikhail Prudnikov
|align=left|Communist Party
|38,763
|12.81%
|-
|style="background-color:#DD137B"|
|align=left|Vladimir Senin
|align=left|Social Democrats
|21,264
|7.03%
|-
|style="background-color:"|
|align=left|Vladimir Gruzdev
|align=left|Independent
|19,371
|6.40%
|-
|style="background-color:#019CDC"|
|align=left|Fyodor Burlatsky
|align=left|Party of Russian Unity and Accord
|16,294
|5.38%
|-
|style="background-color:#2C299A"|
|align=left|Sergey Pykhtin
|align=left|Congress of Russian Communities
|15,329
|5.07%
|-
|style="background-color:"|
|align=left|Mikhail Leontyev
|align=left|Independent
|9,593
|3.17%
|-
|style="background-color:"|
|align=left|Sergey Vorobyov
|align=left|Faith, Work, Conscience
|5,413
|1.79%
|-
|style="background-color:"|
|align=left|Dmitry Zhukov
|align=left|Liberal Democratic Party
|5,181
|1.71%
|-
|style="background-color:#DA2021"|
|align=left|Nikolay Kupchin
|align=left|Ivan Rybkin Bloc
|3,750
|1.24%
|-
|style="background-color:"|
|align=left|Yury Yashkov (Gorny)
|align=left|Independent
|1,562
|0.52%
|-
|style="background-color:"|
|align=left|Yury Tavrovsky
|align=left|Independent
|1,085
|0.36%
|-
|style="background-color:#000000"|
|colspan=2 |against all
|37,493
|12.39%
|-
| colspan="5" style="background-color:#E9E9E9;"|
|- style="font-weight:bold"
| colspan="3" style="text-align:left;" | Total
| 302,583
| 100%
|-
| colspan="5" style="background-color:#E9E9E9;"|
|- style="font-weight:bold"
| colspan="4" |Source:
|
|}

1999

|-
! colspan=2 style="background-color:#E9E9E9;text-align:left;vertical-align:top;" |Candidate
! style="background-color:#E9E9E9;text-align:left;vertical-align:top;" |Party
! style="background-color:#E9E9E9;text-align:right;" |Votes
! style="background-color:#E9E9E9;text-align:right;" |%
|-
|style="background-color:"|
|align=left|Pavel Medvedev (incumbent)
|align=left|Independent
|84,511
|27.10%
|-
|style="background-color:"|
|align=left|Vladimir Gruzdev
|align=left|Independent
|62,708
|20.11%
|-
|style="background-color:"|
|align=left|Viktor Shevelukha
|align=left|Communist Party
|30,540
|9.79%
|-
|style="background-color:#020266"|
|align=left|Aleksandr Bryntsalov
|align=left|Russian Socialist Party
|21,254
|6.81%
|-
|style="background-color:"|
|align=left|Pyotr Pronin
|align=left|Independent
|12,367
|3.97%
|-
|style="background-color:#FF4400"|
|align=left|Nikolay Bocharov
|align=left|Andrey Nikolayev and Svyatoslav Fyodorov Bloc
|8,489
|2.72%
|-
|style="background-color:"|
|align=left|Yelena Makeeva
|align=left|Independent
|7,570
|2.43%
|-
|style="background-color:"|
|align=left|Vladimir Shamailov
|align=left|Independent
|6,869
|2.20%
|-
|style="background-color:#23238E"|
|align=left|Rafael Mustafin
|align=left|Our Home – Russia
|6,141
|1.97%
|-
|style="background-color:#084284"|
|align=left|Yury Lebedev
|align=left|Spiritual Heritage
|3,845
|1.23%
|-
|style="background-color:"|
|align=left|Ilya Kutsenko
|align=left|Independent
|3,266
|1.05%
|-
|style="background-color:#000000"|
|colspan=2 |against all
|56,442
|18.10%
|-
| colspan="5" style="background-color:#E9E9E9;"|
|- style="font-weight:bold"
| colspan="3" style="text-align:left;" | Total
| 311,886
| 100%
|-
| colspan="5" style="background-color:#E9E9E9;"|
|- style="font-weight:bold"
| colspan="4" |Source:
|
|}

2003

|-
! colspan=2 style="background-color:#E9E9E9;text-align:left;vertical-align:top;" |Candidate
! style="background-color:#E9E9E9;text-align:left;vertical-align:top;" |Party
! style="background-color:#E9E9E9;text-align:right;" |Votes
! style="background-color:#E9E9E9;text-align:right;" |%
|-
|style="background-color:"|
|align=left|Pavel Medvedev (incumbent)
|align=left|United Russia
|118,711
|41.65%
|-
|style="background-color:"|
|align=left|Vyacheslav Kovalev
|align=left|Industrial Party (Prompartiya)
|46,539
|16.33%
|-
|style="background-color:"|
|align=left|Oleg Cherkovets
|align=left|Communist Party
|23,392
|8.21%
|-
|style="background-color:"|
|align=left|Yury Ponomarev
|align=left|Liberal Democratic Party
|11,398
|4.00%
|-
|style="background-color:"|
|align=left|Yury Orekhov
|align=left|Independent
|9,713
|3.41%
|-
|style="background-color:#164C8C"|
|align=left|Andrey Lutkovsky
|align=left|United Russian Party Rus'
|4,451
|1.56%
|-
|style="background-color: #00A1FF"|
|align=left|Vladimir Leksakov
|align=left|Party of Russia's Rebirth-Russian Party of Life
|4,242
|1.49%
|-
|style="background-color:#000000"|
|colspan=2 |against all
|61,851
|21.70%
|-
| colspan="5" style="background-color:#E9E9E9;"|
|- style="font-weight:bold"
| colspan="3" style="text-align:left;" | Total
| 286,848
| 100%
|-
| colspan="5" style="background-color:#E9E9E9;"|
|- style="font-weight:bold"
| colspan="4" |Source:
|
|}

2016

|-
! colspan=2 style="background-color:#E9E9E9;text-align:left;vertical-align:top;" |Candidate
! style="background-color:#E9E9E9;text-align:left;vertical-align:top;" |Party
! style="background-color:#E9E9E9;text-align:right;" |Votes
! style="background-color:#E9E9E9;text-align:right;" |%
|-
|style="background-color:"|
|align=left|Dmitry Morozov
|align=left|United Russia
|59,326
|34.22%
|-
|style="background-color:"|
|align=left|Vladimir Rodin
|align=left|Communist Party
|21,946
|12.66%
|-
|style="background-color:"|
|align=left|Yelena Rusakova
|align=left|Yabloko
|20,538
|11.85%
|-
|style="background:"|
|align=left|Konstantinas Yankauskas
|align=left|People's Freedom Party
|14,244
|8.22%
|-
|style="background-color:"|
|align=left|Sergey Vasilyev
|align=left|A Just Russia
|11,365
|6.56%
|-
|style="background-color:"|
|align=left|Anton Yurikov
|align=left|Liberal Democratic Party
|9,811
|5.66%
|-
|style="background-color:"|
|align=left|Sergey Stankevich
|align=left|Party of Growth
|8,321
|4.80%
|-
|style="background:;"| 
|align=left|Darya Mitina
|align=left|Communists of Russia
|7,931
|4.58%
|-
|style="background-color:"|
|align=left|Aleksey Petrovichev
|align=left|Rodina
|5,573
|3.21%
|-
|style="background:"| 
|align=left|Sergey Dorofeev
|align=left|The Greens
|3,984
|2.30%
|-
|style="background:"| 
|align=left|Maria Sorokina
|align=left|Patriots of Russia
|3,904
|2.25%
|-
|style="background:#00A650;"| 
|align=left|Ilya Ukhov
|align=left|Civilian Power
|783
|0.45%
|-
| colspan="5" style="background-color:#E9E9E9;"|
|- style="font-weight:bold"
| colspan="3" style="text-align:left;" | Total
| 173,349
| 100%
|-
| colspan="5" style="background-color:#E9E9E9;"|
|- style="font-weight:bold"
| colspan="4" |Source:
|
|}

2021

|-
! colspan=2 style="background-color:#E9E9E9;text-align:left;vertical-align:top;" |Candidate
! style="background-color:#E9E9E9;text-align:left;vertical-align:top;" |Party
! style="background-color:#E9E9E9;text-align:right;" |Votes
! style="background-color:#E9E9E9;text-align:right;" |%
|-
|style="background-color: " |
|align=left|Aleksandr Rumyantsev
|align=left|United Russia
|81,790
|34.43%
|-
|style="background-color: " |
|align=left|Igor Nikolaev
|align=left|Yabloko
|47,020
|19.79%
|-
|style="background-color: " |
|align=left|Nikolay Volkov
|align=left|Communist Party
|32,292
|13.59%
|-
|style="background-color: " |
|align=left|Maksim Chirkov
|align=left|A Just Russia — For Truth
|20,534
|8.64%
|-
|style="background-color: " |
|align=left|Yury Maksimov
|align=left|Liberal Democratic Party
|14,397
|6.06%
|-
|style="background-color: "|
|align=left|Daniil Shupenya
|align=left|New People
|13,347
|5.62%
|-
|style="background-color: " |
|align=left|Aleksey Volkov
|align=left|Communists of Russia
|8,230
|3.46%
|-
|style="background-color: "|
|align=left|Aleksandr Baklanov
|align=left|Russian Party of Freedom and Justice
|7,429
|3.13%
|-
|style="background-color: " |
|align=left|Anton Palyulin
|align=left|Party of Growth
|3,804
|1.60%
|-
|style="background: ;"| 
|align=left|Roman Ilyin
|align=left|Civic Platform
|3,625
|1.53%
|-
| colspan="5" style="background-color:#E9E9E9;"|
|- style="font-weight:bold"
| colspan="3" style="text-align:left;" | Total
| 237,571
| 100%
|-
| colspan="5" style="background-color:#E9E9E9;"|
|- style="font-weight:bold"
| colspan="4" |Source:
|
|}

Notes

Sources
209. Черемушкинский одномандатный избирательный округ

References

Russian legislative constituencies
Politics of Moscow